The municipality of Coatepec is found in the central region of the Mexican state of Veracruz. It represents the 0.338% of the current state. The municipal seat and largest community of the municipality is also called Coatepec. The Mexican census of 2005 reported a population of 49,608 in the city, while the municipality had 79,787 inhabitants. The municipality also includes many smaller communities within its boundaries. The largest of these are Tuzamapan, Pacho Viejo, and Mahuixtlán.

Details
Coatepec borders the municipalities of Xalapa and Tlalnelhuayocan (north); Teocelo and Jalcomulco (south); Emiliano Zapata (east); and Xico and Teocelo (west).

Often called The Coffee Capital of Mexico, the name Coatepec comes from the Nahuatl coatl (serpent), and tepetl (hill), or "The Hill of the Snakes".

This municipality has four small rivers: the Pixquiac, the Pintores, the Sordo and the Hueyapan; all flow into the Pescados (La Antigua) River.

Coatepec was named a "Pueblo Mágico" in 2006.

Coatepec is known for its coffee, which both tastes and looks appealing. The best option to buy coffee in Coatepec Veracruz is in "La Vereda" or in "Bola de Oro", you really need to discover "Bola de Oro," because it is the most popular variety in the country.

Regarding other matters, Coatepec has many traditions, with the most important being The Feast of Sán Jerónimo, which the people celebrate on September 30 each year.

The foods in Coatepec that are the most popular with the local population and tourists alike include: Tamales, Chilaquiles, Emmoladas, Gorditas, Lupitas, Enfrijoladas, and others.

Climate
Coatepec's yearly median temperature is 19.5 °C (67 °F). Seasonal variations in temperature are moderate as elsewhere in central Mexico, whilst precipitation has more pronounced changes. The warmest month is May, when temperatures top 30 °C (86 °F) on average, although at night because of the high elevation the mercury drops to 15 °C (59 °F). The coolest month is January with temperatures varying from 9 °C (48 °F) to 22 °C (72 °F). Precipitation is at its lowest during the spring months (however still some rainfall falls from late cold fronts or early thunderstorm activity). Rainfall peaks at two times during the year, in June, at the beginning of the rainy season, and in September, towards the end of it. During these months precipitation exceeds on average 300 mm (11.8 in) and have been as high as over 25 in (640.7 mm in September 1974). The city's mild to warm temperatures have their extremes in 33 °C (92 °F) in May 1984 and -1 °C (28 °F) during February, 1976. There are 161 days with rain each year, while fog is common during the winter months.

References
 Link to tables of population data from Census of 2005 INEGI: Instituto Nacional de Estadística, Geografía e Informática
 Veracruz Enciclopedia de los Municipios de México

External links
 Ayuntamiento de Coatepec Official website for the 2005-2007 administration
 Site with Tourist information about Coatepec
 Site of government Current administration
  Municipal Official Information
 Cultural festival
 Geographical information in Tagzania
 El Retoño Ecolodge

Municipalities of Veracruz
Pueblos Mágicos